Margrethe Vestager (born 13 April 1968) is a Danish politician currently serving as Executive Vice President of the European Commission for A Europe Fit for the Digital Age since December 2019 and European Commissioner for Competition since 2014. Vestager is a member of the Danish Social Liberal Party, and of the Alliance of Liberals and Democrats for Europe Party (ALDE) on the European level.

Prior to joining the European Commission, she served in the Danish governments of Poul Nyrup Rasmussen as Minister for Ecclesiastical Affairs from 1998 to 2000 and Minister of Education from 1998 to 2001. She was leader of the Social Liberals from 2007 to 2014, and served as Minister of Economic Affairs and the Interior under Helle Thorning-Schmidt from 2011 to 2014.

Following the 2014 European Parliament election, Vestager was nominated as Denmark's European Commissioner in the Juncker Commission, becoming Commissioner for Competition. In the 2019 European Parliament election, she was one of ALDE's seven lead candidates. After the election, Vestager was nominated as the Renew Europe group's candidate for President of the European Commission. After the election of Ursula von der Leyen as President, Vestager was re-nominated as Denmark's Commissioner. She retained her Competition portfolio while also becoming one of the Commission's three Executive Vice Presidents, with responsibility for "A Europe Fit for the Digital Age".

In her capacity as Commissioner for Competition, Vestager has gained international recognition for investigating, fining, or bringing lawsuits against major multinational companies including Google, Apple Inc., Amazon, Facebook, Qualcomm, and Gazprom. She has been described as "the rich world's most powerful trustbuster"  and "the world's most famous regulator".

Early life and education
Vestager was born in Glostrup, Zealand, a daughter of Lutheran ministers Hans Vestager and Bodil Tybjerg. She grew up in Ølgod, and matriculated from Varde Upper Secondary school in 1986. She studied at the University of Copenhagen, graduating in 1993 with a degree in Economics.

Political career
Vestager has been a professional politician since the age of 21, when she was appointed to the central board and executive committee of the SLP and its European Affairs Committee, and shortly afterwards as National Chairwoman of the Party.

In 2001, Vestager was elected to the Danish Parliament, becoming Chairwoman of its Parliamentary Group in 2007. She was appointed Minister of Education and Ecclesiastical Affairs in 1998.

On 15 June 2007 Vestager secured election as her Party's parliamentary group leader in the Folketing, replacing Marianne Jelved. When Denmark's Prime Minister Lars Løkke Rasmussen called an early election in 2011 after failing to secure majority lawmaker backing for his economic stimulus package, Vestager's Social Liberals and the Conservative People's Party formed a political alliance, pledging to work together no matter which political bloc would win the election.

Minister for Economic and Interior Affairs of Denmark, 2011–2014
From 2011 until 2014 Vestager served as Minister for Economic and Interior Affairs in the three-party Social Democrat-led coalition government of Helle Thorning-Schmidt. Having forced through deep cuts in unemployment benefits of Denmark's generous social welfare system after the country's economy narrowly escaped recession in 2012, she was at one point considered by Danish media and pollsters as the most powerful person in government, even above Thorning-Schmidt.

In her time in office, chaired the meetings of economic and finance ministers of the European Union (ECOFIN) during Denmark's presidency of the Council of Ministers in 2012. In this capacity, she announced that the European Union would cede two of its seats on the board of the International Monetary Fund to emerging economies under a new power-sharing scheme for international financial institutions. She also worked closely with Jean-Claude Juncker to salvage Europe's financial sector and forge a European Banking Union.

Between 2011 and 2014, Vestager led Denmark's campaign against Basel III liquidity rules, arguing in favor of allowing banks to use 75 percent more in covered bonds to fill liquidity buffers than allowed under Basel III rules; at the time Denmark's $550 billion mortgage-backed covered bond market, part of the country's two-century-old mortgage system, was the world's largest per capita. In 2013 she ruled out slowing down steps toward stricter requirements for systemically important lenders and reiterated her stance that banks won't get tax breaks to help them through the transition caused by regulatory reform.

In May 2014, Vestager presented a growth package designed to drag Denmark's economy – at the time Scandinavia's weakest – out of its crisis, raising the country's structural output by 6 billion kroner ($1.1 billion) and cut costs for companies by 4 billion kroner in 2020 through 89 measures to improve the business climate and boost employment.

European Commissioner for Competition, 2014–present
On 31 August 2014, Prime Minister Thorning-Schmidt nominated Vestager as Denmark's EU Commissioner in the Juncker Commission. Despite her repeated denials of campaigning for the Environment portfolio, eventually she was designated the Competition dossier in the Juncker Commission. On 3 October 2014, she won the European Parliament's backing following her confirmation hearing.

In her confirmation hearings, Vestager said she favored settlement of cases before they come to a final executive judgment, for reduced fines or negotiated concessions from the companies.

Within a few months in the office, she brought antitrust charges against Google; Almunia had initially opened the investigation into Google in 2010, and had reached a settlement deal with Google by 2014 but was unable to convince the European Commission to accept it before his term ended. Vestager inherited Almunia's case but has shown greater desire to continue pursuing Google/Alphabet over the alleged antitrust violations. Also, she initiated investigations into the tax affairs of Fiat, Starbucks, Amazon.com and Apple Inc. under competition rules. In 2014, she launched proceedings against Gazprom, one of Europe's main gas suppliers, over allegations of breaching EU antitrust rules by putting in place artificial barriers to trade with eight European countries: Estonia, Latvia, Lithuania, Poland, Czech Republic, Slovakia, Hungary and Bulgaria.

In January 2015, Vestager ordered Cyprus Airways to pay back over 65 million euros in illegal state aid received in 2012 and 2013 as part of a restructuring package; as a consequence, Cyprus suspended operations at its flag carrier resulting in 550 job losses and reduced competition.

In August 2016, after a two–year investigation, Vestager announced Apple Inc. received illegal tax benefits from Ireland. The Commission ordered Apple to pay a fine of €13 billion, plus interest, in unpaid Irish taxes for 2004–2014;  the largest tax fine in history.  In July 2020, the European General Court struck down the decision as illegal, ruling in favor of Apple.

As a result of the EU investigation, Apple agreed to re-structure out of its 2004–2014 Irish BEPS tool, the Double Irish in Q1 2015; Apple's replacement Irish BEPS tool, the CAIA arrangement caused Irish 2015 GDP to rise by 34.4 per cent, and was labelled Leprechaun economics by Nobel Prize-winning economist, Paul Krugman in July 2016.

In July 2017, a fine of $2.7 billion against Alphabet (formerly Google) was levied based on the European Commission claim that Google breached antitrust rules. This fine was later appealed.

In October 2017, Vestager ordered Amazon to pay €250 million of back taxes, and in January 2018, the EU Commission fined Qualcomm €997 million for allegedly abusing its market dominance on LTE baseband chipsets.
In July 2018, she fined Alphabet (Google) €4.3 billion for entrenching its dominance in internet search by illegally tying together their service and other mobile apps with Android. On 22 January 2019 she fined Mastercard €570 million for preventing European retailers from shopping around for better payment terms. In March 2019, Vestager ordered Google to pay a fine €1.49 billion for abusive practices in online advertising. Vestager's actions against American companies as competition commissioner received criticism from US President Donald Trump (who also dubbed her as the EU's "Tax Lady"), stating "She hates the United States, perhaps worse than any person I’ve ever met."

In February 2019, Vestager blocked a merger between the two large European rail companies Siemens and Alstom due to serious competition concerns, despite the fact that both the German and French governments had supported the merger.

Executive Vice President of the European Commission for a Europe Fit for the Digital Age, 2019–present

Following the 2019 European Parliament election, Vestager was proposed as President of the European Commission. Vestager’s campaign for the presidency of the European Commission encountered resistance in France, following her decision to veto the merger between Alstom and Siemens. The prohibition of the merger between two large European industrial companies angered the French president Emmanuel Macron and stood in the way of Vestager’s bid for the presidency of the European Commission.
In June 2019, Prime Minister Mette Frederiksen proposed that Vestager continue as Denmark's Commissioner for another five years. While, initially thought to become First Vice-President, Ursula von der Leyen has since proposed that Vestager, Frans Timmermans and Valdis Dombrovskis all serve as Executive Vice-Presidents of the Commission with Vestager having responsibility for a "Europe fit for the Digital Age". In her role as Vice-President of the European Commission, Vestager had public and private disagreements with Commissioner Thierry Breton, the Frenchman in charge of a major overhaul of the digital rules in the European Union. As Vice-President of the European Commission, Vestager has been a co-chair of the Trade and Technology Council since its creation in 2021.

Other activities

Corporate boards
 Royal Greenland, Member of the Board of Advisors (2004–2007)

Non-profit organizations
 UNICEF Denmark, Member of the Executive Committee (2007–2011)
 Trilateral Commission, Member (2010–2011)
 Blaagaards Seminarium, Chairwoman of the Board (2006–2009)  
 University College Copenhagen, Member of the Board (2006–2009) 
 Copenhagen Business School, Institute for Management, Politics, and Philosophy, Chairwoman of the Advisory Board (2003–2008)
 European Council on Foreign Relations (ECFR), Member
 Trilateral Commission, Member of the European Group

Recognition
 2017 – Doctorate honoris causa, KU Leuven

Political positions
In 2013, Vestager held that “[in] our experience it’s impossible to pursue Danish interests without being close to the core of Europe. You don’t have influence or produce results if you’re standing on the sideline.”

Personal life
Vestager's husband is a gymnasium maths-and-philosophy teacher. They have three daughters, Maria, Rebecca, and Ella. Vestager served as an inspiration for the main character in Borgen, who tries to juggle family life and politics. She is also a knitter and a self-declared feminist. In 2021 she told Femina magazine that we were moving towards gender equality in the workplace “at a completely unacceptably slow speed”. Vestager speaks Danish, English and some French.

See also
 Double Irish arrangement, Apple's 2004–2014 Irish BEPS tool
 EU illegal State aid case against Apple in Ireland, 2004–2014 Commission case against Apple in Ireland
 Leprechaun economics, the effect of Apple's 2015 BEPS re-structuring on Ireland's GDP
 Single malt arrangement, Microsoft's post–2014 Irish BEPS tool
 CAIA arrangement, Apple's post–2015 Irish BEPS tool
 Ireland as a tax haven, overview of Ireland's BEPS tools

Notes

References

External links

 
 www.stm.dk
 www.myheritage.com
 www.elections2014.eu 

|-

|-

|-

|-

|-

|-

|-

|-

|-

1968 births
Living people
Education ministers of Denmark
Danish European Commissioners
Danish feminists
Danish Ministers for Ecclesiastical Affairs
Danish Social Liberal Party politicians
Danish socialists
European Commissioners for Competition
People from Glostrup Municipality
Women European Commissioners
21st-century Danish women politicians
Female interior ministers
Members of the Folketing 2001–2005
Members of the Folketing 2005–2007
Members of the Folketing 2007–2011
Members of the Folketing 2011–2015
Women members of the Folketing
Women government ministers of Denmark
European Commissioners 2014–2019
European Commissioners 2019–2024
Leaders of the Danish Social Liberal Party
Danish Interior Ministers